Colerain Township, Ohio, may refer to:
Colerain Township, Belmont County, Ohio
Colerain Township, Hamilton County, Ohio
Colerain Township, Ross County, Ohio

Ohio township disambiguation pages